Zdeněk Šreiner (2 June 1954 – 28 November 2017) was a Czech football player who competed in the 1980 Summer Olympics, winning the gold medal as part of the national team.

References

External links

1954 births
2017 deaths
Czechoslovak footballers
Czechoslovakia international footballers
Olympic footballers of Czechoslovakia
Footballers at the 1980 Summer Olympics
Olympic gold medalists for Czechoslovakia
Olympic medalists in football
FC Baník Ostrava players
Medalists at the 1980 Summer Olympics
Association football midfielders
Czech footballers